Dimitris Rizopoulos (born August 26, 1984) is a Greek volleyball player, a member of the club Olympiacos CFP.

Personal life 

He was born in Skotoussa, Serres.

Sporting achievements

National Team 
European League:
  2006

References

External links
 GreekVolley profile
 Volleybox profile
 Volleyball-Agency profile
 CEV profile

1984 births
Living people
People from Serres (regional unit)
Greek men's volleyball players
Sportspeople from Central Macedonia